Chlorogenia is a genus of moths in the subfamily Arctiinae. The genus was erected by Edward Meyrick in 1889.

Species
 Chlorogenia cholerota
 Chlorogenia pallidimaculata

References

Lithosiini
Moth genera